Koumandou  is a sub-prefecture in the Beyla Prefecture in the Nzérékoré Region of south-eastern Guinea. The main town is Koumandougou.

References

Sub-prefectures of the Nzérékoré Region